The Under the Radar Festival is a theater festival in New York City, founded in 2005 by Mark Russell, former Artistic Director of P.S. 122 for over twenty years and also Guest Artistic Director for the Portland Institute for Contemporary Art's Time-Based Art Festival from 2006-2008. Under the Radar has its headquarters at the Public Theater.

Under the Radar was canceled and replaced by a virtual event in 2021 due to the COVID-19 pandemic. It was canceled again in 2022 due to "multiple disruptions related to the rapid community spread of the Omicron variant".

References

Del Signore, John. "Mark Russell, Under the Radar Festival". Interview with Mark Russell. Gothamist (blog), January 10, 2008. Accessed January 10, 2008.
"History and Milestones", Portland Institute for Contemporary Art (PICA) and Time-Based Art Festival (TBA Festival), Portland, Oregon. Accessed January 10, 2008.

External links
About Under the Radar – History of the Festival at the Public Theater. Accessed January 10, 2008. Includes "FESTIVAL PERFORMANCE HISTORY" (2005– ).
"About the Under the Radar Festival" at MySpace.com. Accessed January 10, 2008.
Under the Radar – Official webpage at the Public Theater website. Accessed January 10, 2008.

Theatre festivals in the United States
Festivals in New York City
Festivals established in 2005
2005 establishments in New York City